McCarthy is a census-designated place (CDP) in Copper River Census Area, Alaska, United States. It is in Wrangell-St. Elias National Park and Preserve. The population was 107 at the 2020 census, up from 28 in 2010.

Geography and location
None of the area is covered with water. It is connected to the outside world via the McCarthy Road spur of the Edgerton Highway from Chitina, and must be passed through to reach Kennecott, which is also within the McCarthy CDP. Historically, from the end of the road one had to cross the Kennecott River and then a smaller stream using manually propelled ropeways, but a footbridge was built in 1997. Visitors can walk to McCarthy in about 15 minutes, although shuttle vans and buses are available during the tourist season from the bridge to both McCarthy and Kennecott. A private service bridge for vehicle traffic was constructed in 2004 downstream from the footbridge, but use is only available to residents, businesses, and the National Park Service for an annual fee.

Climate
McCarthy has a subarctic climate (Köppen: Dfc).

Demographics

McCarthy first reported on the 1920 U.S. Census as an unincorporated village. With the closure of the post office in 1943, it did not report on the census from 1950 to 1980, though it unofficially returned 22 residents in 1980. It returned again beginning in 1990 when it was made a census-designated place (CDP).

As of the census of 2000, there were 42 people, 26 households, and 6 families residing in the CDP. The population density was 0.3 people per square mile (0.1/km2). There were 47 housing units at an average density of 0.3/sq mi (0.1/km2). The racial makeup of the CDP was 100.00% White.

There were 26 households, out of which 15.4% had children under the age of 18 living with them, 15.4% were married couples living together, 3.8% had a female householder with no husband present, and 73.1% were non-families. 53.8% of all households were made up of individuals, and none had someone living alone who was 65 years of age or older. The average household size was 1.62 and the average family size was 2.14.

Drawn by an increase in tourism since the founding of Wrangell St. Elias National Park and Preserve, a significant portion of McCarthy's summer population resides elsewhere in the winter. This results in them not being counted during the censuses.

In the CDP, the age distribution of the population shows 9.5% under the age of 18, 9.5% from 18 to 24, 28.6% from 25 to 44, 47.6% from 45 to 64, and 4.8% who were 65 years of age or older. The median age was 46 years. For every 100 females, there were 147.1 males. For every 100 females age 18 and over, there were 153.3 males.

The median income for a household in the CDP was $17,188, and the median income for a family was $20,000. The per capita income for the CDP was $16,045. There were no families and 15.2% of the population living below the poverty line, including no under eighteens and none of those over 65.

History

For centuries, Athabascans hunted in the area of McCarthy. Chief Nikolai and his band of Athabaskan Natives had a summer camp at Dan Creek, 15 miles east of McCarthy, where they collected copper nuggets from Dan Creek. Their permanent camp was on the Copper River at the village of Taral near Chitina where they fished for salmon.

Copper was discovered between the Kennicott Glacier and McCarthy Creek in 1900, after which Kennicott Mine, Kennecott Mining Company, and company town of Kennecott were created. Due to a clerical error, the corporation and town used the spelling of Kennecott instead of Kennicott, named for Kennicott Glacier in the valley below the town. The glacier was named after Robert Kennicott, a naturalist who explored in Alaska in the mid-1800s.

Partly because alcoholic beverages and prostitution were forbidden in Kennecott, McCarthy grew as an area to provide illicit services not available in the company town. It grew quickly into a major town with a gymnasium, a hospital, a school, a bar and a brothel. The Copper River and Northwestern Railway reached McCarthy in 1911.

In 1938, the copper deposits were mostly gone and the town was mostly abandoned. The railroad discontinued service that year. Over its 30-year operation, U.S. $200 million in ore was extracted from the mine, making it the richest concentration of copper ore in the world.

The population of McCarthy and Kennecott fell to almost zero until the 1970s, when the area began to draw young people from the many who came to Alaska in the '70s for adventure and the big money of the Trans Alaska Pipeline project. In the '80s, after the area was designated Wrangell-St. Elias National Park (1980), it began to draw some adventurous tourists to the new national park.  The few people that lived there began to provide a variety of tourist services. There has always been at least one family living in the McCarthy area since 1953.

The old mine buildings, artifacts, and colorful history attract visitors during the summer months. The Kennecott and McCarthy area ranks as one of the United States' most endangered landmarks by the National Trust for Historic Places. Emergency stabilization of the old buildings has been done and more will be required.

In 2014, the TV  show Edge of Alaska premiered on Discovery Channel. The show has caused controversy though, as many town residents feel the town is portrayed in a bad light due to the troublesome incidents that have occurred there.

1983 shooting
In an attempt to disrupt the Alaska pipeline, 39-year-old Louis D. Hastings, armed with a .223-caliber Ruger Mini-14 semi-automatic rifle, murdered six of the 22 citizens of McCarthy on March 1, 1983. The victims were Maxine Edwards, Harley King, Les and Flo Hegland, Tim Nash and Amy Lou Ashenden Nash.  He also wounded two people. In July 1984, Hastings was sentenced to 634 years in prison.

This case, and the town of McCarthy, were showcased on the Discovery Channel's Alaska Ice Cold Killers episode "Frozen Terror".

References

 https://books.google.com/books?id=DIG_9oBssrAC&pg=PA176&lpg=PA176&dq=mccarthy+alaska+murders&source=bl&ots=fdAGDpJope&sig=iYT244SPoiVH9sluH17FIaybBLE&hl=en&ei=U0uxS4q1FpLYsQOs0KCiAQ&sa=X&oi=book_result&ct=result&resnum=8&ved=0CBsQ6AEwBw#v=onepage&q=&f=false/

External links
 McCarthy/Kennecott history
 Weather conditions from a remote weather station in McCarthy

Census-designated places in Alaska
Census-designated places in Copper River Census Area, Alaska
Census-designated places in Unorganized Borough, Alaska
Mining communities in Alaska